Marlene Tseng Yu (born 1937, in Taiwan) is a Taiwanese-American artist known for her mural-sized, nature-inspired, abstract expressionist paintings.  She has exhibited her "Forces of Nature" series extensively in Europe, Asia, and North America.  She is founder of the Rainforest Art Foundation.

Biography
Yu graduated from National Taiwan Normal University.   She then went to the University of Colorado at Boulder for her master's degree in fine arts, and then taught at University of Denver.  
Her first televised interview was given by Barbara Walters on The Today Show.
Her dual-hemispheric education allowed her to synthesize Chinese painting and Abstract Expressionism, experiment with acrylic paint and develop her own brush techniques on canvas and paper, with nature as her inspiration.

Her main theme is the "Forces of Nature," in which she hopes "to capture the spirit of the universe, its rhythm and movements, its quiet and angry moods, its colors and forms..." in natural phenomena such as avalanches, geysers, coral reefs, calving glaciers, black holes, stalagmite formation, amber resin, Aspen leaves and wind, red rock canyons, crystals, turquoise, and volcanoes.
In the 1980s, her minor Dream Series depicted a love story with female torsos and body parts surrounded by animals symbolizing the male.

Recent years

Yu's  works are permanently displayed on rotation in a circular room at QCC Art Gallery at the Queensborough Community College, alongside temporary exhibits such as Pablo Picasso, Andy Warhol, and QCC art students, who have submitted essays discussing her technique and subject matter.  In 2006, her four "Elements of Life" (Earth, Air, Water, Fire) paintings were followed by her "March of the Icebergs," in response to today's growing concerns about global warming.

Personal life

She, and real estate developer husband, James K. Yu, lived and worked in SoHo, New York City from 1969 to 2007, and in 2008, opened a studio in Long Island City, Queens.  The couple has two children, Daniel and Stephanie.

Selected exhibitions

 Musée d'Art et d'Histoire
 Grande Arche
 National Gallery in Prague
 Taipei Fine Arts Museum
 National Art Museum of China
 Lincoln Center
 New York Academy of Art
 Chelsea Art Museum
 San Jose Museum of Art

References

External links
 Official site.

1937 births
Abstract expressionist artists
American artists of Chinese descent
American women painters
American women writers of Chinese descent
American writers of Chinese descent
Painters from New York City
Living people
Modern painters
National Taiwan University alumni
Taiwanese emigrants to the United States
University of Colorado alumni
20th-century American painters
20th-century American women artists
21st-century American women artists
People from SoHo, Manhattan